Routes is a studio album by Ramsey Lewis, released in 1980 on Columbia Records. The album reached No. 7 on the Billboard Top Jazz Albums chart.

Production
The album was produced by Larry Dunn and Allen Toussaint.

Critical reception
The Washington Informer called the album "a mixture of African and Caribbean flavor," deeming it "a further extension of Ramsey Lewis' innovation." The Boston Globe called it "little more than funky cocktail lounge music which smoothly blends into the woodwork."

Track listing

Personnel
Arranged By – Maurice White 
Arranged By [Rhythm Track] – Al McKay, Larry Dunn
Artwork By [Cover Illustration] – Robert Grossman
Bass – Byron Miller, David Barard, Kenny Burke
Design [Cover Concept And Design] – John Berg
Drums – Herman V. Ernest III, James Gadson, Ndugu Chancler
Electric Piano [Yamaha Electric, Fender Rhodes] – Sam Henry, Jr. 
Engineer [Assistant, Vocals] – Ken Fowler
Engineer [Assistant] – Dennis Hansen 
Engineer [Vocals] – George Massenburg
Engineer, Mixed By – Chris Brunt, Danny Jones 
Executive-Producer – George Butler
Featuring [Musical Assistance] – Louis Satterfield
Flugelhorn – Rahm Lee
Guitar – Al McKay, Leo Nocentelli, Roland Bautista
Keyboards – Larry Dunn 
Percussion – Fred White, Kenneth "Afro" Williams, Paulinho Da Costa, Phillip Bailey
Photography By [Back Cover Photo] – Don Hunstein
Piano [Steinway Concert Grand Piano, Electric Piano [Fender Rhodes] – Ramsey Lewis
Producer, Arranged By – Allen Toussaint, Larry Dunn 
Saxophone – Donald Myrick
Soloist, Alto Saxophone – Donald Myrick
Synthesizer, Programmed By [Synthesizer], Piano, Electric Piano [Fender Rhodes] – Larry Dunn 
Trombone – Louis Satterfield 
Trumpet – Michael Davis
Vocals – Jon Lind, Maurice White, Warren Weinberg

Charts

References

1980 albums
Ramsey Lewis albums
Albums produced by Allen Toussaint
Columbia Records albums